Chloropropane may refer to:

 n-Propyl chloride (1-chloropropane)
 Isopropyl chloride (2-chloropropane)